Coniston is an intercity train station located in Coniston, New South Wales, Australia, on the South Coast railway line. The station serves NSW TrainLink trains travelling south to Port Kembla or Kiama and north to Wollongong and Sydney.

History

The district south of central Wollongong began to develop as an industrial area at the beginning of the 20th century. In 1916, the NSW Government Railways opened a branch line from the main South Coast line south of Wollongong to the new wharves at Port Kembla. The branch's sole passenger station was Mount Drummond, but it closed in 1923, reopening as Coniston in 1925. A "Coniston Station Estate" surrounding the station, consisting of industrial and residential allotments, was subdivided in 1939. The branch line assumed increased significance with Australia's entry into World War II, with a dramatic increase in steel production prompting the Railways to duplicate the line from Wollongong to Cringila. Coniston Station was demolished in 1941 and replaced with a new two-platform station at its present-day, main line location.

The new station included three single-storey buildings: a ticket office at street level on Gladstone Avenue, and two identical platform buildings containing a waiting room and toilets. The buildings were constructed in the functionalist style from dichromatic brick using iron oxide and clinker bricks with soldier courses. The platform buildings feature distinctive Art Deco style vertical 'fins' extending above the awnings at both ends. While all three buildings remain today, the exteriors have been painted over and the original internal fit-outs removed. The station is deemed to have local heritage significance.

Platforms & services
Coniston has two side platforms. It is serviced by NSW TrainLink South Coast line services travelling between Sydney Central, Bondi Junction and Kiama, as well as local services from Waterfall and Thirroul to Port Kembla.

Transport links
Premier Illawarra operates one route via Coniston station:
11: Wollongong to University of Wollongong

References

External links

Coniston station details Transport for New South Wales

Buildings and structures in Wollongong
Railway stations in Australia opened in 1916
Railway stations in Australia opened in 1941
Regional railway stations in New South Wales